Thomas Mullen (born 1974) is an American novelist.

Biography
Mullen was born in Rhode Island. He graduated from Portsmouth Abbey School in Portsmouth, Rhode Island, and Oberlin College in Ohio. He is married, has two children, and lives in Atlanta, Georgia.

Bibliography
Mullen has, published five novels of varying genre. They have been well received.

 2006 The Last Town on Earth
 2010 The Many Deaths of the Firefly Brothers
 2011 The Revisionists (Mulholland Books US and Mulholland Books UK)
 2015 Darktown
 2017 Lightning Men
 2020 Midnight Atlanta
 2023 Blind Spots

Awards
The Last Town on Earth received the 2007 James Fenimore Cooper Prize for historical fiction. It was also recognized by USA Today as the "Best Début Novel" of the year and the Chicago Tribune as one of their "Books of the Year". In 2021, Midnight Atlanta was shortlisted in the Gold Dagger category at the Crime Writer's Association Awards, with the result to be announced in July 2021.

References

External links

1974 births
Living people
Oberlin College alumni
21st-century American novelists
American male novelists
James Fenimore Cooper Prize winners
Portsmouth Abbey School alumni
21st-century American male writers